Irina Gerlits (born 29 April 1966) is a Kazakhstani former basketball player who competed in the 1988 Summer Olympics and in the 1992 Summer Olympics. She was born in Krasnokutsk, Pavlodar Oblast, Kazakh SSR and played for Universitet Alma-Ata, CD CREF Madrid and CD Universidad de Oviedo in Spain, and BC Bordeaux and BC Reims in France.

References

1966 births
Living people
People from Pavlodar Region
Kazakhstani women's basketball players
Olympic basketball players of the Soviet Union
Olympic basketball players of the Unified Team
Basketball players at the 1988 Summer Olympics
Basketball players at the 1992 Summer Olympics
Olympic bronze medalists for the Soviet Union
Olympic gold medalists for the Unified Team
Olympic medalists in basketball
Soviet women's basketball players
Medalists at the 1992 Summer Olympics
Medalists at the 1988 Summer Olympics
Honoured Masters of Sport of the USSR
Kazakhstani expatriate sportspeople in France
Kazakhstani expatriate sportspeople in Spain
Expatriate basketball people in France
Expatriate basketball people in Spain